Damu Kenkre (born Damodar Kashinath Kenkre) (1928–2008) was an Indian director known for his work in the Marathi language theatre.

Stage career
Some of Kenkre's most famous plays include Hamlet, Suryachi Pille and Akhercha Sawaal.

Honors
Kenkre received the Sangeet Natak Akademi Award in 1974 and the Jeevan Gaurav Puraskar in 2008. He was ex-Director of Cultural Affairs Govt of Maharashtra. Kenkre died in September 2008.

References

External links
 

Indian theatre directors
People from Goa
Konkani people
1928 births
2008 deaths
Recipients of the Sangeet Natak Akademi Award